Vernon Lawrence Clare (17 April 1925 – 18 March 1998) was a New Zealand musician, cabaret owner, restaurateur and music teacher. He was born in Wanganui, Wanganui, New Zealand on 17 April 1925.

References

1925 births
1998 deaths
New Zealand music teachers
New Zealand musicians
New Zealand restaurateurs